Opernwelt (Opera World) is a monthly German magazine for opera, operetta and ballet. It includes news about current performances, portraits of composers and performers, articles about opera houses, performance spaces, and contemporary and historical subjects from the world of opera and classical music. It reviews recordings and books and publishes monthly schedules of German and international opera houses. The magazine's website offers full text search for past issues. A year book is published every October.

Awards

Each year since 1994, at the end of the season, the magazine sponsors a jury of 50 critics to select the best in several categories:
 opera house of the year
 staging of the year
 stage director of the year
 singer of the year
 stage- and costume designer of the year
 orchestra of the year
 premiere of the year 

They are usually selected from German-speaking countries, Austria, Germany and German-speaking Switzerland. In 2011, La Monnaie received the accolade, the first time it has been given to a non-German speaking house.

Opera house of the year

References

External links
 Opernwelt

1960 establishments in Germany
Awards established in 1993
German-language magazines
Monthly magazines published in Germany
Music magazines published in Germany
Magazines about opera
Magazines established in 1960
Magazines published in Berlin
German theatre awards